NGC 5177 is a lenticular galaxy.  Based on a redshift of  the galaxy is crudely estimated to be about 300 million light-years away.

On April 16, 2010 UT, the Palomar Transient Factory automated wide-field survey detected a supernova on the outskirts of NGC 5177.  The supernova is known as SN 2010cr and is located at 13:29:25.11 +11:47:46.4. A confirmation spectrum was taken with the Palomar Hale telescope on April 17 UT which showed it to be approximately 13 days before peak brightness.  The Hubble Space Telescope took STIS/UV spectroscopic observations on May 3, 2010.

See also

 List of supernovae
 History of supernova observation
 List of supernova remnants
 List of supernova candidates

References

External links

 

5177
Virgo (constellation)
Lenticular galaxies